Leonhard Nagenrauft (9 March 1938 in Bischofswiesen – 22 May 2017 in Berchtesgaden) was a West German luger who competed in the late 1960s and early 1970s. He won the silver medal in the men's singles event at the 1971 FIL World Luge Championships in Olang, Italy.

Nagenrauft also won two medals in the men's singles event at the FIL European Luge Championships with a gold in 1967 and a bronze in 1972.

Nagenrauft also competed in two Winter Olympics, earning his best finish of fifth in the men's singles event at Sapporo in 1972.

References
FIL Luge announcement of Nagenruft's death.
Hickok sports information on World champions in luge and skeleton.
List of European luge champions 
Sports-reference.com profile
Wallechinsky, David. (1984). "Luge - Men's singles". The Complete Book of the Olympics: 1896-1980. New York: Penguin Books. p. 575.

1938 births
2017 deaths
German male lugers
Lugers at the 1968 Winter Olympics
Lugers at the 1972 Winter Olympics
Olympic lugers of West Germany
People from Berchtesgadener Land
Sportspeople from Upper Bavaria